Dulkadir Eyalet or Marash Eyalet was an eyalet of the Ottoman Empire.

History
The Dulkadirids were the last of the Anatolian emirates to yield to the Ottomans, managing to remain independent until 1521, and were not fully incorporated into the empire until 1530. The eyalet was established in 1522. After its disestablishment in 1864, its territories were united with Aleppo and Diyarbekir eyalets.

Administrative divisions
Eyalet of Marash consisted of four sanjaks between 1700 and 1740 as follows:

 Marash Sanjak (Paşa Sancağı , Kahramanmaraş)
 Malatya Sanjak (Malatya)
 Aintab Sanjak (Ayıntab Sansağı, Gaziantep)
 Kars-i Maraş Sanjak (Kadirli)

1831 
Maraş Livasi (Paşa Sanjak)
Malatya Livasi
Samsat Livasi
Gerger Livasi

See also
 Ali Bey, Prince of Dulkadir

References

Eyalets of the Ottoman Empire in Anatolia
History of Kahramanmaraş Province
History of Adıyaman Province
Eyalets of the Ottoman Empire in Asia
1522 establishments in the Ottoman Empire
1864 disestablishments in the Ottoman Empire